Rory Kinsella (born 1954) is an Irish former hurling manager and player who played as a right wing-forward at senior level for the Wexford county team. He managed the Wexford senior team from 1996 until 1999.

A schoolteacher he trained at Thomond National College of Physical Education in Limerick, and though in St. Aidans, C.B.S., Whitehall, Dublin and in Bunclody, County Wexford.

Honours

Player
Wexford
 Leinster Under-21 Hurling Championship (1): 1973

Selector/Manager
Bunclody FCJ
 All-Ireland Colleges Senior B Football Championship (1): 1986

Wexford
 All-Ireland Senior Hurling Championship (1): 1996
 Leinster Senior Hurling Championship (2): 1996, 1997

References

1954 births
Living people
Hurling managers
Hurling selectors
Irish schoolteachers
Naomh Éanna hurlers
Wexford inter-county hurlers